Uncivilization is the sixth studio album by American band Biohazard, released on September 11, 2001, by Sanctuary Records and is the only album to feature guitarist Leo Curley, who would leave the band shortly after to focus on writing his own music.

Track listing

Personnel
Credits adapted from AllMusic.

Biohazard 
 Billy Graziadei – vocals, guitar, engineer, production
 Evan Seinfeld – vocals, bass, production
 Leo Curley – guitar
 Danny Schuler – drums, engineer, production

Additional personnel
 Phil Anselmo – additional vocals on track 9
 Tristan Avakian – additional guitar
 Ken Caillat – executive producer
 Pete Deboer – engineering
 George Fullan – assistant engineer
 Randy Glenn – quality control
 Janelle Guillot – voiceover
 Jive Jones – production
 U.E. Nastasi – mastering
 Melinda Pepler – production coordination
 Sen Dog – additional vocals on track 8
 Corey Taylor – additional vocals on track 10
 Ed Stasium – mixing
 Peter Steele – additional vocals on track 13
 Kristian Storli – authoring
 John Trickett – executive producer
 Charlie Watts – mastering
 Chuck Ybarra – graphic design

Charts

References

Biohazard (band) albums
2001 albums
Sanctuary Records albums